Ridgeway is a suburban area of Bristol, located in the east of the city between Fishponds, Speedwell and Eastville.

It is a mainly residential area and has a playing field, which was home to Eastville Rovers Football Club (now known as Bristol Rovers) from 1893 until they moved to Eastville Stadium in 1897.

References

Areas of Bristol